Palencia Baloncesto, officially named as CD Zunder Palencia, is a professional basketball team based in Palencia, Castile and León. The team currently plays in league LEB Oro.

History
The club was founded in 1979 at Colegio Marista of Palencia, with the aim to support farm teams competing at provincial and regional tournaments.

The professional basketball team was created on 1997 and played during five years at Liga EBA before being invited to join the LEB Plata. On the 2008–09, Palencia Baloncesto won the Copa LEB Plata and was champion of this league, promoting for the first time in their history to LEB Oro, the Spanish second division.

In 2014 Palencia Baloncesto was defeated by CB Tizona in the promotion playoffs finals to Liga ACB by 1–3. Two years later, the club achieved the promotion by finishing as champion of the 2015–16 LEB Oro season and the Copa Princesa de Asturias, but resigned to promote due to the impossibility to fulfill the requirements.

Naming
CD Maristas Palencia had several denominations through the years:

Maristas Palencia: 1979–2002
Hormigones Saldaña Palencia: 2002–2005
Provincia de Palencia: 2005–2006
Alimentos de Palencia: 2006–2008
Faymasa Palencia: 2008–2009
Palencia Baloncesto: 2009–2013
Quesos Cerrato Palencia: 2013–2017
Chocolates Trapa Palencia: 2017–present

Players

Current roster

Depth chart

Head coaches
Natxo Lezkano 2008–2015
Porfirio Fisac 2015
Sergio García 2015–2017
Joaquín Pardo 2017–2018
Alejandro Martínez 2018–2019
Carles Marco 2019–2022
Pedro Rivero 2022–

Season by season

Trophies and awards

Trophies
LEB Oro: (1)
2016
Copa Princesa de Asturias: (3)
2015, 2016, 2023
LEB Plata: (1)
2009
Copa LEB Plata: (1)
2009
Copa Castilla y León: (2)
2012, 2015

Individual awards
All-LEB Oro Team
Urko Otegui – 2013
Marc Blanch – 2016

Notable players
 Charles Abouo
  Mike Hansen
  Nikola Mirotić
 Michael Dickerson
  Jeff Xavier
 Gabrielius Maldūnas
 Mindaugas Kačinas
 Simas Jasaitis

References

External links
Official website
Non official website

Sport in Palencia
Basketball teams in Castile and León
LEB Oro teams